Coffin Mountain is a mountain located in the Willamette National Forest in Linn County, Oregon.

Coffin Mountain is most well known for its astonishing hike that goes to the summit. It is situated nearby Bachelor Mountain. Coffin Mountain stands 5,770 ft above sea level (1,759 m). The summit has views of the Cascade Mountain Range. Coffin Mountain also has an array of wildflowers and beargrass. The Coffin Mountain Lookout was built in 1905 but the current lookout was built in 1984 along with a helicopter pad. The lookout rests on the north end of an elongated coffin-shaped ridge, hence the name. The lookout is used by the U.S. Forest Service during the summer months to spot wildfires.

References

Mountains of Oregon
Mountains of Linn County, Oregon